Kim Mi-ok (born 1 October 1978) is a South Korean professional tennis player.

Tennis career
A right-handed player, Kim was a gold medalist for South Korea at the 2002 Asian Games, partnering Choi Young-ja in the women's doubles. The pair, who were unseeded, won the gold medal with a win in the final over the tournament's top seeds, Indonesians Wynne Prakusya and Angelique Widjaja.

Between 2002 and 2006 she represented the South Korea Fed Cup team in a total of nine ties. Her only singles win came against Hong Kong's Kristin Godridge and she won five doubles rubbers.

Kim has featured mostly in ITF level events during her professional career, with 3 singles and 13 doubles titles to her name. She made a WTA Tour main draw appearance in the doubles at the Korea Open in 2005, reaching the quarter-finals. They defeated Marion Bartoli and Tamarine Tanasugarn in the first round.

Initially retiring in 2006, Kim has played in the occasional ITF tournament in her home country since 2016 and won two $25,000 doubles titles in 2018.

ITF finals

Singles: 5 (3–2)

Doubles: 18 (13–5)

References

External links
 
 
 

1978 births
Living people
South Korean female tennis players
Tennis players at the 2002 Asian Games
Tennis players at the 2006 Asian Games
Asian Games gold medalists for South Korea
Asian Games medalists in tennis
Universiade silver medalists for South Korea
Universiade medalists in tennis
Medalists at the 2002 Asian Games
Medalists at the 2001 Summer Universiade
21st-century South Korean women